Odisha (formerly Orissa), is an eastern Indian state on the Bay of Bengal. It is known for its tribal cultures and its many ancient Hindu temples. During the ancient times, many small kingdoms existed now known as Western Odisha, which was ruled by local chieftains.Western Odisha, or the western part of Odisha, India, extends from the Bolangir district in the south to the Sundargarh district in the north.

Tourist attractions Western Odisha

Some of the tourist attractions in the area include:-

 Samaleswari Temple (Samlei Gudi) is a 17th-century shrine dedicated to the goddess Maa Samaleswari, the tutelary goddess of the Kosal region. Samalei Gudi is the second most visited temple in the present Odisha state after Puri Jagannath Temple.
 Huma is famous for the Leaning Temple of Lord Shiva, which is relatively older and leans like the Leaning Tower of Pisa. Catching fish is not allowed and tradition holds that if one kills any fish from the river which flows behind Huma Temple, one will become a stone statue.
 Ushakothi is a wildlife sanctuary harboring elephants, tigers, gaurs, sambars, black panthers, deer, spotted deer, bears and other animals.

 Kandhara is the birthplace of the poet Bhima Bhoi, the great propounder of Mahima Dharma, and a pilgrimage-cum-sight seeing spot.
 Debrigarh Wildlife Sanctuary is like an emerald nestled in the serene blue waters of Hirakud Reservoir.  Made a sanctuary in 1985, it comprises Lohara Reserve Forest, Lohara and Debrigarh Reserve Forests of Barapahad Hills.  Debrigarh means “The abode of the Goddess”.  It is 40 km from Sambalpur. Dhodrokusum, the main entry gate, is 12 km from Hirakud Reservoir, at the end of the right dyke of Hirakud Dam.  At Debrigarh, there are vehicle safaris and boat rides available to view more than 50,000 migratory birds from Siberia and other cold regions.  It is a natural habitat for jaguars, sambars, black panthers, deer, spotted deer and wild bears.
 Sambalpur city boasts of several temples of Liakhai, Madanmohan, Satyabadi, Bariha, Brahampura, Dadhibamana, Timini, Gopalji, Budharaja Shiva Temple, Maneswar Shiva Temple, Gupteswar, Balunkeswar, Loknath, the Goddess Samaleswari, Pataneswari, Batmangala, Budhimaa, Mahamayi, and others, as well as Sambalpuri handlooms.

 Nrusinghanath  is a place in Paikmal, with a waterfall and it is one of the most popular tourist places of the western Odisha region.  A 500-year-old temple dedicated to the Hindu god Narasimha is also situated there.  One more interesting fact is that the God is worshiped here in the form of a cat as compared to the general Lion-man idol of the god.  The God Narsimha is known here as "Marzara Kesari" in the Sambalpuri.
 Balangir is the modern capital of the ex-Patna State and its current district headquarters. It has numerous Sambalpuri Saree shops, Samaleswari Temple, Patneswari Temple, Nrusinghanath Temple, Santoshi mata Temple, Gopal jee Temple, Sailashree Palace, Rajendra Park.
 Patnagarh is the ancient capital of the kingdom of Patna, and has a 12th-century Someswar Siva Temple and Patneswari Temple.
 Ranipur-Jharial is famous for the Hypaethral Temple of sixty-four yoginis and for being a place of confluence of religious faiths, including Saivism, Buddhism, Vaisnavism and Tantrism.
 Kusangei Temple in Kusang is an 11th-century temple of Maa Kusangei and it is a fine example of the Kosali architecture.
 Harishankar is the most popular tourist place of Kosal.  It is famous for its 15th-century Vishnu, Shiva and Bhairavi Temple.  It stands on the southern slope of the Gandhamardan Hills, which are complemented by a perennial stream.  It is also known for its natural sliding rock where one can waterslide while having a bath under the waterfall.
 Three remarkable Buddhist statues are situated in Boudh town. At Shyamsundarpur village and Pragalapur village are the 9th century. Rameswar Temple; Jogindra Villa Palace; Hanuman Temple, Chandra Chuda & Matengeswar Temple; Gandharadi Temple, Padmatola Sanctuary, and Nayakpada Cave.
 Pradhanpat is a waterfall on the Pradhanpat hill.
 Vikramkhol is a site with pictographic inscriptions.
 Koilighugar Waterfall is located at Lakhanpur.
1- Patalganga is Very nice place of Boden block in nuapada district 
3- Budhikomna Pataleswar Temple
4- Saliha smriti
5- Patora Dam
6- Thikali Dam

 Sonepur town is known as the ‘Second Varanasi of India’ abode.  There are several temples and gardens, including Suvarnameru, which is on the left bank of the river Tel, towards the southwest of its confluence with the river Mahanadi.
 The Thengo dam is the picnic spot which is present in the surrounding of dense forest .It attracts hundreds of tourists annually. The wildlife and environment is best for nature lovers.
 Khaliapali is a Mahima shrine.
 Khandadharoffers Miriglotah, a waterfall.

References 

Tourism in Odisha